The 2004 San Diego Padres season was the 36th season in franchise history. It saw the club finish with a record of 87-75, the fifth most wins in franchise history.  With 87 wins, the Padres improved their win–loss record by 23 games over the 2003 season (64-98), the single largest improvement from one full season to the next in team history.  The Padres also moved into their new home Petco Park, which drew a total of 3,016,752 fans to 81 home games, shattering all previous attendance marks.

Offseason
November 26, 2003: Mark Kotsay was traded by the San Diego Padres to the Oakland Athletics for Terrence Long and Ramón Hernández.

Regular season

Petco Park

Petco Park is an open-air stadium in downtown San Diego, California. It opened in 2004, replacing Qualcomm Stadium as the home park of Major League Baseball's San Diego Padres. Before then, the Padres shared Qualcomm Stadium with the NFL's San Diego Chargers.  The stadium is named after the animal and pet supplies retailer PETCO, which is based in San Diego and paid for the naming rights.

Opening Day starters

Season standings

National League West

Record vs. opponents

Roster

Player stats

Batting

Starters by position 
Note: Pos = Position; G = Games played; AB = At bats; H = Hits; Avg. = Batting average; HR = Home runs; RBI = Runs batted in

Other batters 
Note: G = Games played; AB = At bats; H = Hits; Avg. = Batting average; HR = Home runs; RBI = Runs batted in

Pitching

Starting pitchers 
Note: G = Games pitched; IP = Innings pitched; W = Wins; L = Losses; ERA = Earned run average; SO = Strikeouts

Other pitchers 
Note: G = Games pitched; IP = Innings pitched; W = Wins; L = Losses; ERA = Earned run average; SO = Strikeouts

Relief pitchers 
Note: G = Games pitched; W = Wins; L = Losses; SV = Saves; ERA = Earned run average; SO = Strikeouts

Award winners
 Trevor Hoffman, Hutch Award
 Jake Peavy, ERA Champion (2.27)
2004 Major League Baseball All-Star Game
 Mark Loretta, second base, reserve

Farm system 

LEAGUE CO-CHAMPIONS: Mobile

References

External links
 2004 San Diego Padres at Baseball Reference
 2004 San Diego Padres at Baseball Almanac

San Diego Padres seasons
San Diego Padres season
San Diego Padres